Cicârlău is a commune in Maramureș County, Romania. It is composed of four villages: Bârgău (Kissikárló), Cicârlău, Handalu Ilbei (Ilobabánya) and Ilba (Iloba).

References

Communes in Maramureș County